Merchiston Preparatory School was founded in Pietermaritzburg, South Africa in 1892. It was founded by Miss Agnes Rowe and Miss Elizabeth Allan who were inspired by Merchiston Castle School in Edinburgh, Scotland.

Pupils
Merchiston Preparatory School is a boys' preparatory school which offers day-schooling from Grade RR to Grade 7 and boarding for Grade 3 to Grade 7. Merchiston is an established feeder school for Maritzburg College.

Motto
The school's motto is Ready Aye Ready. Again, it is closely based on the Merchiston Castle School motto of Ready Ay Ready.
This motto means "ready, yes, ready"

Notable Merchistonians
Butch James, rugby player
Craig Joubert, international rugby referee
Cuan McCarthy, cricketer
Brett Evans, PSL & international football player
Darian Townsend, Olympic swimmer
Ian Kirkpatrick (South African rugby player)
Jonty Rhodes, cricketer
Kevin Pietersen, cricketer
Nils Bang, oceanographer
Shaun Morgan, musician
Harold Strachan, artist and freedom fighter
Jesse Kriel, Springbok rugby player

References

External links
 Merchiston Prep School's official website

Private schools in KwaZulu-Natal
Primary schools in South Africa
1892 establishments in the Colony of Natal
Pietermaritzburg